Hongpu (莊親王 弘普; 9 August 1713 – 16 April 1743) was Qing dynasty imperial peer prince and second son of Yunlu, Prince Zhuang Ke of the First Rank. Although he never held a title of the prince of the first rank, his eldest son was selected to succeed the Prince Zhuang peerage.

Life 
Hongpu was born on 9 August 1713 to secondary princess consort Zhuangke of the First Rank, lady Li. He had two biological brothers, Honghao and Hongming. In 1723, Hongpu's father, Yunlu, was adopted into the Prince Zhuang peerage after the death of Boguoduo, Šose's eldest son. In 1736, Hongpu was granted a title of the prince of the fourth rank by his paternal cousin. 

In 1739, second Prince Li of the First Rank, Hongxi, was accused of rebellion. While Qianlong Emperor was staying in the Chengde Mountain Resort, Hongpu sent his people to report an urgent secret matter, but was arrested at the High Copper Wall. After the return from the imperial hunt, Hongpu was demoted to grace defender duke. In the following year, he was designated as a right vice director of the Imperial Clan Court. Hongpu died in 1743 and was posthumously honoured as Hereditary Prince Gongqin (恭勤世子, "gongqin" meaning "respectful and diligent") and was later posthumously promoted to Prince Zhuang of the First Rank.

Family 
 Primary consort, of the Hurha clan (虎尔哈氏)
Secondary consort, of the Guo clan (郭氏)
 Prince Zhuangshen of the First Rank Yongchang (1737-1788), first son
 General of the third rank Yongke (1738-1794), second son
 Yongjian (永坚; 1741-1765), third son
 Mistress, of the Zhou clan (周氏)

References 

Qing dynasty imperial princes 
Prince Zhuang
1713 births
1743 deaths